McClennan is a surname. Notable people with the surname include:

Alonzo Clifton McClennan (1855–1912), American physician
Brian McClennan (born 1962), New Zealand rugby league player and coach
Darren McClennan (born 1965), New Zealand soccer player
Mike McClennan, New Zealand rugby league player and coach
Tommy McClennan (1908–1962), American blues singer and guitarist